Allen James Nichelini (November 23, 1909 – January 3, 1992) was an American football running back who played in the National Football League from 1935 to 1936 for the Chicago Cardinals. Nichelini posted 423 rushing yards and 133 receiving yards in his two seasons. In 1935, he scored four rushing touchdowns, tied for second in the league.

References

1909 births
1992 deaths
American football running backs
Chicago Cardinals players
Saint Mary's Gaels football players